Río Abajo is a barrio in the municipality of Utuado, Puerto Rico. Its population in 2010 was 237. It is an isolated, rural barrio in the Cordillera Central (Puerto Rico), the mountain range that goes east to west across the center of Puerto Rico.

History
Puerto Rico was ceded by Spain in the aftermath of the Spanish–American War under the terms of the Treaty of Paris of 1898 and became an unincorporated territory of the United States. In 1899, the United States Department of War conducted a census of Puerto Rico finding that the population of Río Abajo barrio was 1,235.

Hurricane Maria which struck Puerto Rico on September 20, 2017, washed away the Río Abajo bridge and approximately 60 families were left isolated. Residents invented a zip line to bring food across until a temporary bridge was built. The construction of a permanent bridge was completed in March 2018.

See also

 List of communities in Puerto Rico

References

Barrios of Utuado, Puerto Rico